Flatford is a small hamlet close to East Bergholt  in Suffolk. It is most famous for Flatford Mill, Willy Lott's Cottage and Bridge Cottage, immortalised in the paintings of John Constable.

Access by road
Flatford is accessible by Road from East Bergholt, with a limited access route looping down to the main Flatford Car park. The route is a two way road at the top section, allowing access to the properties there. From the car park onwards though the route is one way, back into East Bergholt, emerging near the village War memorial and the church.

Access by foot and public transport

As well as being able to walk from East Bergholt along the road route, Flatford can also be accessed on foot from Manningtree and Dedham, Essex.

External links

Hamlets in Suffolk
East Bergholt